The Last Don is the solo debut album by Don Omar. It was released in 2003 and included collaborations from artists such as Daddy Yankee, Hector "El Bambino" and Trebol Clan, among others. The album sold 411,000 units in the US and was certified gold by the Recording Industry Association of America (RIAA). The album sold over 1,000,000 copies worldwide.

A re-release of the album, titled The Last Don: The Gold Series was released on December 19, 2006, through Machete Music. It includes two new songs: "Pobre Diabla" and "Ronca".

Track listing

Chart performance

Sales and certifications

References

2003 debut albums
Don Omar albums
Albums produced by Luny Tunes
Albums produced by Noriega
Polydor Records albums